Pardosa distincta is a species of wolf spider in the family Lycosidae. It is found in the United States and Canada.

References

External links

 

distincta
Articles created by Qbugbot
Spiders described in 1846